Mark A. F. Kendall (BE PhD FTSE FRSA FNAI) (born 1972) is an Australian biomedical engineer, inventor, scientist and entrepreneur.

He is Founder and CEO of WearOptimo Pty Ltd and the Vice-Chancellor's Entrepreneurial Professor at the Australian National University.

Kendall was formerly the Professor of Biomedical Engineering at the University of Queensland, where he led a team at the Australian Institute for Bioengineering and Nanotechnology. He was Founder, CTO and a Director of Vaxxas. Prior to this, in the UK, he was a University Research Lecturer at the University of Oxford and a lecturer at Magdalen College, Oxford. Whilst at Oxford, Kendall was Associate Director of the PowderJect Research Centre for Gene and Drug Delivery.

Kendall serves at the co-chair of the $150 million Australian Stem Cell Therapies Mission and on the World Economic Forum Global Future Council on Biotechnology.

Kendall has filed more than 160 patents (including territories), published in excess of 300 papers, licensed his technologies seven times (including to Merck & Co.) and partnered globally, including with the World Health Organization, and the Bill & Melinda Gates Foundation. The biotech enterprises he has founded or made significant contribution to have generated in the region of $2 billion Aus in value.

Kendall's contributions to innovation in global healthcare has been recognised with more than forty awards. These include recent elections as:

• World Economic Forum Technology Pioneer (2015).

• Fellow of ATSE; Australian Academy of Technological Sciences and Engineering (2017).

• Fellow of the Royal Society for the encouragement of Arts, Manufacture and Commerce (now the RSA), UK; (2017).

Kendall is a CSL Young Florey Medallist and Rolex Laureate.

Kendall's work regularly features in international media, including on the National Geographic Channel.

Kendall's TedGlobal talk has been viewed more than a million times.

https://www.ted.com/speakers/mark_kendall

Background
Kendall was born on 16 April 1972. He received his Bachelors of Engineering (Hons I, 1993) and PhD (1998) from the University of Queensland.

In 1998, Kendall moved to the UK to take up a position in the Department of Engineering Science at the University of Oxford (1998-2006). He has subsequently held positions at the University of Queensland (2006-2018) and at the Australian National University (2018–Present).

Contributions to Biotechnology 
Kendall has over 160 patent applications of which, 128 have been granted to date. He has authored more than 300 refereed papers.

At the University of Oxford (1998-2006) Kendall developed a biolistic technique for the delivery of vaccines directly into the skin without the use of needles.

At the University of Queensland (2006-2018) Kendall invented the Nanopatch for needle-free delivery of vaccines.

At WearOptimo and the Australian National University (2018 to present), Kendall has invented the Microwearable™ sensor for personalised medicine.

During his career, Kendall has collaborated with major global health partners including the Bill & Melinda Gates Foundation, World Health Organization and Merck & Co.

He is an Australian Government Academy of Science COVID-19 Expert.

Selected Awards, Honours and Prizes 

 Elected to the World Economic Forum Global Future Council on Biotechnology (2019 to present).
 Elected Fellow of the Australian Academy of Technology and Engineering ATSE (2017).
 Elected Fellow of the Royal Society for the encouragement of Arts, Manufacture and Commerce (now the RSA), UK (2017).
 Elected to the World Economic Forum Global Future Council on Entrepreneurship and Innovation (2016-2018).
CSL Young Florey Medal (2016).
 Dr John Dixon Hughes Medal for Medical Research Innovation (2016).
 World Economic Forum Technology Pioneer (2015).
 Rolex Laureate Award for Enterprise (2012) for his "pioneering efforts to expand knowledge and improve human life".
 2011 Australian Innovation Challenge winner.
 2011 Eureka Prize for Interdisciplinary Research.
 2010 Merck Translational Research Excellence Commercialisation Award.
 2005 Best Medical Innovation Award (Popular Science magazine).
 Younger Engineer of Great Britain (2004).

Contributions to biotech companies 

As Associate Director of the Oxford University PowderJect Research Centre (2000-2006), Kendall advanced biolistics technology, commercialised with PowderJect, purchased by Chiron (later Novartis) in 2003; and then with PowderMed, purchased by Pfizer in 2006.

Kendall founded Vaxxas in 2011 to advance his Nanopatch technology for global impact, securing more than $40 million of investment, in the series A ($15m) and B (in excess of $25m) rounds. The Nanopatch technology has been licensed to Merck & Co. He served as the Vaxxas Chief Technology Officer, Director, and Chair of the Vaxxas Advisory Board (2011-2015).

In 2018, Kendall founded WearOptimo where he serves as CEO.

References

1972 births
Living people
Australian bioengineers
Biomedical engineers
University of Queensland alumni
Alumni of the University of Oxford